Pērkone (Pērkons inn) is a small suburban settlement in Nīca Parish, South Kurzeme Municipality, in the Courland region of Latvia. It is situated near the southern border of Liepāja. Near Pērkone is located Reiņu forest, the one of the closest to Liepāja forests. 

Pērkone is chiefly known because near it are located the hotel "Jūrnieka Ligzda" and the guest house "Vērbeļnieki".

References 

Villages in Latvia
South Kurzeme Municipality
Grobin County
Courland